Andreas Siljeström (born 21 July 1981) is a Swedish professional tennis player who specializes in doubles. He has a career doubles high-ranking of world No. 57 achieved in May 2012.

ATP career finals

Doubles: 3 (3 runners-up)

Challenger and Futures finals

Doubles: 54 (25–29)

Doubles performance timeline

External links
 
 

1981 births
Living people
Swedish male tennis players
Middle Tennessee Blue Raiders men's tennis players
21st-century Swedish people